Jean-Marie Huon de Kermadec (Brest, 15 August 1747 — Brest, 31 May 1796) was a French Navy officer.

Career 
Kermadec was born to the family of Anne François du Mesacm de Mescaradec and of Jean Guillaume Huon de Kermadec. He was the brother of Jean-Michel Huon de Kermadec, and nephew of François Pierre  Huon de Kermadec. 

Kermadec joined the Navy as a Garde-Marine on 12 January 1766. He was promoted to Lieutenant on 13 March 1779.

Serving on the 74-gun Annibal, in the division under Suffren, Kermadec took part in the Battle of Porto Praya. He was wounded by a bullet to the thigh, but refused to receive medical attention before the fighting was over. In February 1782, Kermadec transferred on the 40-gun frigate Pourvoyeuse. Later, he was given command of the 24-gun corvette Subtile and took part in the Battle of Negapatam on 6 July 1782.

Sources and references 
 Notes

References

Bibliography
 
 

External links
  

18th-century French people
French Navy officers